Fiddle Creek is a stream in northeast Franklin County in east central Missouri.

The stream enters the Missouri River floodplain after crossing under Missouri Route T at Oetters and then runs along the south margin of the floodplain past St Albans to enter the Missouri River approximately 1.5 miles northeast of St Albans.

Fiddle Creek got its name because fiddling was a popular pastime among early settlers near the creek.

See also
List of rivers of Missouri

References

Rivers of Franklin County, Missouri
Rivers of Missouri